Greg Maher (14 May 1967 – 15 September 2016) was an Irish Gaelic footballer who played as a right wing-forward at senior level for the Mayo county team.

References

1967 births
2016 deaths
Claremorris Gaelic footballers
Gaelic football forwards
Mayo inter-county Gaelic footballers